Jy Hitchcox (born 18 August 1989) is an Australian former professional rugby league footballer who plays as a  and  for the Western Suburbs Red Devils in the Country Rugby League and the Illawarra Rugby League premiership. 

He previously played for the Wests Tigers in the NRL, Featherstone Rovers in the Kingstone Press Championship and the Castleford Tigers (Heritage № 964) in the Super League. Hitchcox spent time away from Castleford at the Batley Bulldogs and Halifax in the Championship, and at Bradford in League 1. He later joined the Bradford Bulls on a permanent deal in the second tier. 

Jy is the only player to score on debut in all tiers of professional Rugby League in both hemispheres.

Background
Hitchcox was born in Byron Bay, New South Wales, Australia. 

He played his junior football for the Mullumbimby Giants before being signed by the Gold Coast Titans. As a youngster, Hitchcox played for the Australian Schoolboys Under-18s team.

Playing career

Australia
In 2009, Hitchcox played for the Gold Coast Titans' NYC team.

In 2010, Hitchcox joined the Melbourne Storm.

After a stint with Manly RUFC in the Shute Shield, Hitchcox joined the Wests Tigers in 2012.

In Round 23 of the 2014 NRL season, Hitchcox made his NRL début for the Wests Tigers against the Sydney Roosters. He scored a try on debut.

England
On 19 December 2014, Hitchcox signed a two-year contract with the Featherstone Rovers in the Kingstone Press Championship starting in 2015.

Castleford Tigers
In November 2015, Hitchcox signed a 1-year contract with Super League team Castleford Tigers starting in 2016.

Hitchcox scored 2 tries in his début for Castleford in a live televised game against Hull F.C.

He played in the 2017 Super League Grand Final defeat by the Leeds Rhinos at Old Trafford.

Leigh Centurions
On 29 Oct 2021 it was reported that he had signed for Leigh Centurions in the RFL Championship

References

External links

Castleford Tigers profile
NRL profile
Wests Tigers profile
SL profile

1989 births
Living people
Australian rugby league players
Australian expatriate sportspeople in England
Australian expatriate sportspeople in France
Balmain Ryde-Eastwood Tigers players
Batley Bulldogs players
Bradford Bulls players
Castleford Tigers players
Featherstone Rovers players
Halifax R.L.F.C. players
Leigh Leopards players
Rochdale Hornets players
Rugby league centres
Rugby league fullbacks
Rugby league wingers
Rugby league players from Byron Bay, New South Wales
Toulouse Olympique players
Wests Tigers players
Wests Tigers NSW Cup players